Johannes Nicolaus de Milis, from Verona (or from Brescia according to other sources), was doctor of the laws and advocate, active in Rome during the first half of the 15th century. He wrote a legal repertorium between about 1430 and 1440.

Literary works 
Allegationes in causa Brabantina matrimoniali pro Duce

External links

References 

15th-century Italian jurists
15th-century Italian writers
Writers from Verona